Cimetière parisien de Bagneux is one of the three Parisien cemeteries extra muros, located in Bagneux. The cemetery has a large Jewish section (many of the divisions have exclusively Jewish graves) and is sometimes known as the Jewish cemetery.

History
Before the site became a cemetery, it was the scene of heavy fighting in May 1871, in the war between the Versailles and the Fédérés.

The cemetery was opened on 15 November 1886 and is one of the three Parisien Cemeteries extra muros, the others being Cimetière Parisien de Thiais (opened in 1929) and Cimetière Parisien de Pantin. It was opened at the same time as Pantin, (which is northeast of Paris). Both have similar entrances. Bagneux is the smallest of the three cemeteries serving Paris, but the most active.

Notes
The cemetery is still open and there are about 10 burials a day. The cemetery is divided into 115 divisions. It is estimated that there are around 83,000 graves.

The cemetery was the burial place of Oscar Wilde until his remains were moved to Père Lachaise Cemetery in Paris. Similarly, Jeanne Hébuterne, the model and artist who was Amedeo Modigliani's lover and mother of his only child, was originally buried here. Despondent over his death, Jeanne Hébuterne committed suicide and her family interred her at Cimetière de Bagneux until finally relenting and allowing her remains to be transferred to the Père Lachaise Cemetery in 1930 to rest beside Modigliani.

There are nearly 5,500 trees (about 20 different species). It is home to many birds (35 different species have already been counted) and squirrels.

Notable burials

Monuments
There are monuments for:
 Jews who died in the Second World War (division 1)
 The Warsaw Ghetto (division 115)
 The victims of concentration camps and those who died as a result of "Nazi barbarism". There are many of these monuments in the  Jewish divisions.

Military graves
The cemetery has a number of military sections.

There are two divisions dedicated to the French Military who died in the First and Second World War.

Division 19 contains two sections dedicated to British Commonwealth dead and which are maintained by the Commonwealth War Graves Commission. These plots contain around 35 Commonwealth service war graves of the First World War (mostly British soldiers who died in 1914), and a few from the Second. A notable example was John Wilson (1889–1914), who was a peacetime Scottish professional footballer and died of wounds.

Individual burials
 Albert Rubin (1887–1956), French/Jewish Painter & Sculptor.
 Yury Annenkov (1889–1974), Russian & French artist known for his book illustrations and portraits.
 Junie Astor (1912–1967), singer
 Eugène Atget (1857–1927), photographer
 Barbara (Monique Serf) (1930–1997), singer
 Claude Berri (1934–2009), French actor, writer, producer, director, and distributor
 María Blanchard (1881–1932), Spanish cubist painter
 Frida Boccara, (1940–1996), singer
 Lucienne Boyer (1903–1983), singer
 Martial Brigouleix (1903–1943), military hero
 Charles Bruneau (1883–1969) linguist and philologist
 Francis Carco (1886–1958), writer
 Demetre Chiparus (1886-1947), Romanian sculptor
 Marcel Dalio (1900–1983), actor
 Bella Darvi (1928–1971), French/Polish actress
 Léon Deubel (1879–1913), poet
 Jean-Jacques Gautier (1908–1986), author
 Michèle Girardon (1938–1975), French film actress
 Gribouille (Marie-France Gaîté) (1941–1968), singer
 Marcelle Henry (1895–1945), one of only six women who were awarded the Compagnon de la Libération
 Alfred Jarry (1873–1907), writer
 Jules Laforgue (1860–1887), poet
 Rose Laurens (1953–2018), singer
 André Leducq (1904–1980), cyclist
 Helene Rytmann (1908–1980), wife of Louis Althusser, a resistance fighter during the second world war, and French communist activist
 Corinne Luchaire (1921–1950), actress
 Georges Madon (1892–1924), French World War I ace
 Jacqueline Maillan (1923–1992), actress
 Alexander Marmorek (1865–1923), bacteriologist
 Jacques Monod (1918–1985), actor
 Mela Muter (Maria Melania Mutermilch) (1876–1967), French/Polish artist
 Jean Paulhan (1884–1968), writer, critic
 Jehan Rictus (1867–1933), poet
 Jules Rimet (1875–1956), founder of the World Cup 
 Alexander Salkind (1921–1997), film producer
 Stéphane Sirchis (1959–1999), musician, founder member of French band Indochine
 Albert Stopford (1860–1939), an antique dealer who rescued Romanov jewels
 John Wilson (1889–1914), Scottish footballer
 Jean Vigo (1905–1934), film director

Location
Located to the southwest of the city of Paris, France, the main entrance to the Cimetière de Bagneux is located at 43–45, Avenue Marx-Dormoy, in Bagneux, Hauts-de-Seine. There are two smaller entrances: Porte de Fontenay on Avenue Jean-Jaurès (near the junction with Avenue Marx-Dormoy) and Porte de Bagneux on Rue de l'Égalité (near the junction with Avenue de Garlande).

The cemetery is located next to the small local (communal) cemetery.

Public transport
 The Cimetière de Bagneux is a short walk from the Châtillon – Montrouge station, which can be reached by taking line 13.

 The Cimetière de Bagneux is also served by bus lines 68, 128, and 323.

There is a Vélib' station at Rue Molière (21209).

Gallery

References

External sources
 Adapted (in part) from the article Cimetière de Bagneux, from Wikinfo, licensed under the GNU Free Documentation License.

External links
 Cimetière Parisien de Bagneux on the Mairie de Paris website (including plan)

Bagneux
Commonwealth War Graves Commission cemeteries in France